Navigational is the second full-length album by Centro-Matic. The album was recorded by Matt Pence in Milstadt, Illinois, at Jay Farrar's studio.

Track listing 
All songs were written by Will Johnson.
 Never Mind the Sounds
 All Hail the Label Scouts
 Ruin This With Style
 With Respect to Alcohol
 Ordinary Days
 This Vicious Crime
 Cross You that Way.
 The Ballad of Private Rifle Sound
 Not Forever Now. 
 Numbers One and Three. 
 Lasted ’til Today.
 Hazlitt Takes to Shore
 Line. Connection. Aim
 The Panacea Tonight
 The Massacre Went Well
 The Beautiful Ones

Personnel 
 Will Johnson – vocals, guitars
 Scott Danbom – vocals, keyboards, violin
 Mark Hedman – bass
 Matt Pence – drums

References

External links
Official site

Centro-Matic albums
1999 albums